José Antonio Pasillas II (born April 26, 1976) is an American musician best known as the drummer and co-founder of alternative rock band Incubus.

Biography
José Pasillas is of Mexican descent. He grew up in Calabasas, California. He began playing drums in 1990. Later in 1991, José and friends Brandon Boyd, Mike Einziger, and Alex Katunich (aka Dirk Lance; replaced by Ben Kenney in 2003) began Incubus in high school in the San Fernando Valley outpost of Calabasas. He endorses DW drums and Sabian cymbals.

José has mentioned he has never had any formal training for the drums, which he says has positives and negatives. Some of his influences include Chad Sexton of 311, Stewart Copeland of The Police, and Tim Alexander of Primus.

Before dedicating himself full-time to Incubus, he was a full-time art student (as was Brandon), and he continues to create designs in his free time.

Other Work
José recently mentioned recording drums with California band LIFE. He has also had a side project, Time Lapse Consortium, with bandmate Mike Einziger.

Equipment
DW Drums & Sabian Cymbals:
Drums – DW Collectors Series Clear Acrylic with Gold Hardware
8X5 Rack Tom
10X5 Rack Tom
12X6 Rack Tom
16X13 Floor Tom
18X14 Floor Tom
20X18 Bass Drum
13x3 Rocket shells Carbon Fiber Znare 
14x8 Rocket Shells Carbon Fiber Snare 
18X6 Octoban
Cymbals – Sabian
HHX Evolution Hi-Hats 13"
HH Raw Bell Dry Ride 21"
HH Vintage Ride 21" (Used as a crash)
Prototype Crash 22" (Made Specifically For Him)
Vault Crash 20"
HH Cina kang 10"
HHX Chinese 18"
AAX Splash 8"
AAX Splash 10"
HHX Evolution Splash 12"
Drum Heads – Remo
Toms: Clear Emperors – batter, Clear Ambassadors – resonant
Bass Drum: Clear Powerstroke 3 – batter, Standard DW Head – resonant
Snare: Emperor Coated and Coated Ambassador – batter, Ambassador – resonant
Hardware
DW Three Sided Curved Drum Rack
PDSRC15V Rack Clamp X20
DWCP9700 Boom Arms X9
DWCP9300 Snare Stand X2
DWCP9100AL Pneumatic Airlift Throne X1
DWCP9000 Single Pedal X1
DWCP9900 DBL Tom Stand X1
DWCP9500TB Hi Hat Stand X1
Sticks – Promark
Pro mark  Hickory 2b tip

References

External links
 
 
 José Pasillas on YouTube
 José Pasillas on Instagram

1976 births
Living people
American rock drummers
American musicians of Mexican descent
Chicano rock musicians
Moorpark College alumni
Musicians from California
People from Calabasas, California
Incubus (band) members
Alternative metal musicians
Nu metal drummers
20th-century American drummers
American male drummers
21st-century American drummers
Time-Lapse Consortium members